Marennes is a former commune in the Charente-Maritime department, southwestern France. On 1 January 2019, it was merged into the new commune Marennes-Hiers-Brouage.

History
For a long time it was one of the most prosperous cities of the Saintonge due to its location in the middle of the salt-water marshes at a time where salt was a valuable commodity.
Marennes is a center for oyster farming.

Population

References

External links

Former communes of Charente-Maritime
Charente-Maritime communes articles needing translation from French Wikipedia
Populated places disestablished in 2019

County of Saintonge